Cale:Drew is a 2003 album by the New Zealand post-rock band Jakob. It gets its title from the names of twins of guitarist Jeff Boyle's sister.  It is dedicated to the memory of bassist Maurice Beckett's mother, who died in 2002. The album was recorded in Wellington by David Holmes, the guitarist in the band Kerretta, an Auckland-based experimental rock band. It was mastered by Chris Chetland at Kog Transmissions.

The statue on the album cover is the Spirit of Napier, found on the Marine Parade in Napier.

Track listing 

Cale:Drew produced two singles: "Semaphore" and "The Diffusion of Our Inherent Situation".  It was nominated for Best Rock Release at the 2004 bNet Music Awards.

Additional musicians 
 Jane Pierard played cello on "Faye"
 Tristan Dingemans (of HDU) played guitar on "Laburnum"
 Jesse Booher (of Looma) played guitar on "I Was Hidden"

Videos for "Semaphore" and "The Diffusion of Our Inherent Situation" were made by Ed Davis, and are available at the band's official website.

External links 
Jakob homepage

2003 albums
Jakob (band) albums